Minatitlán is a town in the  Mexican state of Colima.  It serves as the municipal seat of the surrounding Minatitlán Municipality.

Economy
Minatitlán has a significant agricultural economy. The main crops grown include coffee beans, corn, mangos, green tomatoes, rice, jalapeños, oranges, sugar cane, mamey sapote, and other fruit trees. There's also a large iron mine located at the Astilla mount, named "Peña Colorada".

References

External links
  Minatitlán, Colima Enciclopedia de los Municipios de México, INAFED
  Ayuntamiento de Minatitlan, Colima, Mexico municipal government website.

Populated places in Colima